Diego Nelson Campos Huamán (born 28 May 1996) is a Peruvian footballer who plays as a goalkeeper for Juan Aurich.

Club career

Melgar
18-year old Campos moved to FBC Melgar in 2015 after a good season with Alianza Lima's reserve team. Campos played for Melgar's reserve team in his first season. He got his official debut in the Peruvian Segunda División for Melgar against Universidad San Martín on 10 July 2016. In his second season, he played 11 games, while he played 21 in the following season and 9 in the 2018 season.

In January 2019, Campos was loaned out to Real Garcilaso for the rest of the year. However, he wasn't able to make a single appearance for the team and was only on the bench for three times in the Peruvian Primera División.

Campos left Melgar at the end of 2019.

Chavelines
On 28 February 2020, Campos joined Peruvian Segunda División side Chavelines Juniors. He left the club at the end of the year.

References

External links
 
 

Living people
1996 births
Association football goalkeepers
Peruvian footballers
Peruvian Primera División players
Club Alianza Lima footballers
FBC Melgar footballers
Real Garcilaso footballers